Southern Highlands may refer to:

 Southern Highlands (New South Wales), Australia, a small geographical and wine region located between Sydney and Canberra
 Southern Highlands Province, Papua New Guinea
 Southern Highlands, a community in the Las Vegas Valley, Nevada, United States
 Southern Highlands, Appalachian Mountains, southeast United States
 Southern Highlands, Tanzania, Africa, a region of rich biodiversity in south-western Tanzania
 The Southern Highlands of Mars, part of Mars' planetary-scale hemispheric dichotomy